The Ghost Map: The Story of London's Most Terrifying Epidemic – and How it Changed Science, Cities and the Modern World is a book by Steven Berlin Johnson in which he describes the most intense outbreak of cholera in Victorian London and centers on John Snow and Henry Whitehead.

It was released on 19 October 2006 through Riverhead.

Synopsis 
The work covers the 1854 Broad Street cholera outbreak. The two central figures are physician John Snow, who created a map of the cholera cases, and the Reverend Henry Whitehead, whose extensive knowledge of the local community helped determine the initial cause of the outbreak.  Dr. John Snow was a revered anesthetist who carried out epidemiological work in Soho, London.   Around the mid-1850s Snow figured out the source of cholera contamination to be the drinking water from the Broad Street pump.

Reception 
The New York Times reviewed The Ghost Map, stating that there was "a great story here". A review posted in the International Journal of Epidemiology was largely favorable, stating that "the single weakness of this book is a bewildering final section which attempts to apply John Snow's work to a long list of contemporary problems. But for the reader prepared to put the book down at page 217, Steven Johnson has written a comprehensive, diversely sourced and insightful blockbuster account of a cholera outbreak in Victorian London."
Reviews

See also 
 Epidemiology
 Germ theory
 Miasma theory

References 

2006 non-fiction books
2006 in the environment
History books about London
History books about medicine
Cholera
Spatial epidemiology
Riverhead Books books